Achalaite ((Fe2+, Mn)(Ti, Fe3+, Ta)(Nb, Ta)2O8) is a black mineral of the wodginite group, first discovered in 2013.

It crystallizes in the monoclinic system and has a dark, metallic luster, a specific gravity of 6.285 and a Mohs hardness of 5.5.

Achalaite occurs in the intermediate zone of topaz- and tantalite-bearing pegmatite. Associated minerals include rutile, quartz and albite.

Its name comes from the type locality: the Achala batholith in Córdoba, Argentina and the mineral has been approved by the IMA with the acronym 2013-103.

References

Manganese minerals
Iron(II,III) minerals
Niobium minerals
Oxide minerals
Inosilicates
Titanium minerals
Tantalum minerals
Monoclinic minerals
Minerals described in 2013